Monsieur R, (Richard Makela), is a French rap artist whose work focuses on the political rap genre. His music features hard driven rhythms with thumping base lines, known as "old school", which conveys the hard reality of his environment. There is a rich legacy of 'reality rap' going back to 1982 with artists such as Run DMC and continuing with KRS-One, Public Enemy, Ice-T and Dead Prez. Monsieur R is originally from Belgium. His parents were from the Democratic Republic of the Congo, (DRC) formerly known as Zaire before its independence. Monsieur R was born in 1975, in Belgium where he spent his early years. He and his family moved back to the DRC when he was 3 years old. The family migrated to Europe moving into the Seine-Saint-Denis area of Paris in 1989.

In his early career, he was a member of the Hip Hop group "Menage À 3". In 1998, 2001, and 2002, he produced compilations against the far right, called Sachons Dire Non.

After releasing his solo debut in 1997, Au Commencement and two more albums (Mission' R (1999) and ANTICONstituellemen (2000)), he finally achieved recognition outside France with his 2004 album, Politikment Incorrekt, which featured U.S. and French rap legends Ol' Dirty Bastard, Mobb Deep's Prodigy, KRS-One and Rockin' Squat  as well as popular R&B artist, Akon. There was much debate over this album, as in July 2005, he was accused by the Mouvement Civique Militant, a nationalist organisation, of inciting of racial hatred after they had listened to the song "FranSSe".

Discography

Au Commencement (1997) 
 Intro
 Au Commencement
 Est-ce une vie ? (feat. 2Bal' Niggets)
 Verset III (feat. Ménage A 3)
 Casino
 R III
 Les Cowboys (feat. Ménage A 3)
 R Le missionnaire
 Pinocchio (justice pour la justice)
 L'enfer sur Golgotha
 2000 ans ap. J-C
 Outro

===Mission' R''' (1999) ===
 Intro
 Guerilla urbaine
 Mais que veux-tu?
 "R" Liberté (feat. P.H.I.L.O. (Ad'hoc-1))
 Dossier "R" (feat. Kid Mesa (Gued'1))
 Baby come on
 Tout est permis
 Ne me laisse pas
 Le rêve français
 Imagine "R"
 Comme un oiseau qui s'envole (feat. D.O.C. (2Bal))
 Putain de droits de l'homme
 C'est dommage
 J'aurais voulu vivre comme Jésus-Christ
 Tcha tcha tcha (feat. G-Kill (2Bal) et Djamatik (Neg Marrons))
 L'indépendant
 Et si c'était demain (feat. Akhenaton)
 Le nouvel ordre mondial (feat. P.H.I.L.O. (Ad'hoc-1))

ANTICONstitutionnellement (2000) 
 ANTICONstitutionnellement
 Quoi ma gueule ? (feat. Mystik, G-Kill (2 Bal), Lino (Ärsenik)
 Tragédie (feat. Pit Bacardi)
 Un simple regard sur le monde (feat. Dragon davy (Soundkail))
 Tu veux savoir (feat. Rocca, Rockin' Squat, La Brigade (Acid & Agent X), Profecy, Ritmo, Reoz, Etyr)
 Poésie urbaine
 41 balles
 Papa MC
 1,2,3
 Bon baiser de juda (feat. Busta Flex, Paul Guan (Comité des brailleurs))
 Le soldat inconnu
 Misère (feat. Fabe, Faf La Rage, Sat (Fonky Family), Ritmo, Off)
 R comme un homme libre (feat. Freeman d'IAM)
 Interlude
 Nique la police
 Anticonstitutionnellement (instru)
 Poésie urbaine (instru)

Révolution R (2001) 
 Bang Bang
 Qu'est-ce qu'elle a ma gueule ?
 Misère
 Tragédie
 20 ans
 Comme un oiseau qui s'envole
 Et si c'était demain
 Tout est permis
 Tcha tcha tcha (remis
 Fils et fille du ghetto
 J'accuse
 Au commencement (remix)
 R3
 L'arme

 Politikment Incorrekt (2004) 
 Street Politik
 Criminologie
 Coup De Gueule Coup De Gun
 Pour Mes Frères
 International Husler (feat. Prodigy (Mobb Deep))
 Le Monde D’Aujourd’hui
 FranSSe
 This Is Not (feat. Ol' Dirty Bastard)
 Rebel Musik (feat. Akon)
 Descente En Enfer
 Misère Humaine
 Interlude Antisocial 05 (feat. Olivier Besancenot)
 Antisocial 05 (feat. Enhancer)
 Par Tous Les Moyens (feat. Ménage à 3)
 Our Philosophy (feat. KRS-One & Rockin' Squat)
 Manipulation Médiatique
 Depuis Le 11/09
 Street Gospel
 Pouvoir Remix 05 (feat. Lino (Ärsenik))

Black Album (2006) 
 J'ai la haine
 Monsieur Fric
 Ennemi public # 1 - Feat Jacques Mesrine
 Passion du crime
 Guetto republicain
 R l'insolent (Le roi du 77)
 Rebelion
 Revolutionnaire - Feat Youssoupha
 Braquage verbale - Feat Ilegal Click
 R

Le CHE : une braise qui brûle encore (2007) 
 Intro [Ft. Olivier Besancenot] 
 amarade Ne Pleure Pas 
 Camarade De Laz Sierra 
 Un Peuple Uni Ne Meurt Jamais (El Pueblo Unido) 
 Ernesto Guevara 
 De Bueno Aires A Kinshasa [Ft. Keny Arkana] 
 Le Silence Tue 
 Regarde Autour De Toi 
 Ni D'Ici Ni D'Ailleurs 
 L'internationale 2007 
 Je Suis Révolte 
 Le Pouvoir Au Peuple 
 Triompher Ou Mourir

Articles
French Right Reviles Rappers, The Indypendent
"Monsieur R", transcript of broadcast on The World'', Public Radio International, March 13, 2006.

References

Living people
French rappers
French people of Democratic Republic of the Congo descent
Year of birth missing (living people)
French hip hop record producers